Holiday (foaled in 1911) was an American Thoroughbred racehorse best known for winning the 1914 Preakness Stakes. Owned by Mrs. Archibald Barklie, he was sired by Broomstick. Holiday was out of the mare Leisure, a daughter of Meddler.

Early racing career 

Holiday was a slow developing horse that took four attempts to break his maiden in New York. Late in his two-year-old season he placed second in the Greenfield Stakes at Gravesend Race Track on Coney Island in south Brooklyn, New York.

Preakness Stakes 
Holiday, described as "a good-looking little bay gelding" will best be remembered for his win in the $2,500 1914 Preakness Stakes at Pimlico Race Course in Baltimore, Maryland run on Thursday, May 21.

Holiday went off as the second longest shot at 9–2 in the field of six three-year-olds. In that race Holiday led from the start and led passing the stands for the first time clocking the first quarter in :23-2/5. He continued a very fast pace around the club house turn and down the back stretch recording fractions of :48-2/5 and 1:13-2/5.

Coming into the home stretch his three length lead diminished to a single length. Holiday was tiring badly but held on to win by 3/4 of length from second choice Brave Cunarder with another 1-1/2 lengths back to Defendum for third. Holiday finished the classic in a final time of 1:58 flat under jockey Andy Schuttinger for the one and one eighth mile race.

Holiday was the last gelding to win the race until Prairie Bayou won in 1993.

Late racing career 

Later in his three-year-old season Holiday won the Williamsbridge Handicap at Morris Park Racecourse in Westchester County, New York.  In the early part of his four-year-old season Holiday was wintered at Fair Grounds Race Course in New Orleans, Louisiana. During his stay at Fair Grounds he won an allowance race and placed second in the Thanksgiving Handicap.

Breeding

References

1911 racehorse births
Racehorses bred in Kentucky
Racehorses trained in the United States
Preakness Stakes winners
Thoroughbred family A5